Columbia Coliseum, also known as Columbia Gymnasium, was a gymnasium on the campus of Columbia University (now the University of Portland) in Portland, Oregon. It was designed in 1902 by Joseph Jacobberger to house sports that were traditionally played outdoors, like baseball and football. Constructed the following year it was the largest gymnasium in Oregon, and possibly the Pacific Northwest. Starting in 1905, Columbia Coliseum became the site of an annual statewide track and field event hosted by the university. It was last used in 1927 and has since been demolished.

History
At , Columbia Coliseum was the largest sports venue in Oregon (and possibly the Pacific Northwest) when it opened in 1903. The gymnasium was constructed with trusses so no support beams would obstruct the playing area. The building featured natural light from glass skylights in the ceiling. Tracks were on the outside of a dirt playing surface, which was big enough for sports traditionally played outdoors like baseball or football. Although indoor baseball (now known as softball) was becoming popularized at the turn of the 20th century, Columbia University organized a traditional baseball team to play indoors, a rarity at the time. 

Joseph Jacobberger was the building's architect. In 1927, Columbia University again commissioned Joseph Jacobberger (now partnered with Alfred Smith) to design a new gymnasium for the school which became Howard Hall. 

In an Oregon Daily Journal article on August 22, 1909 entitled "Columbia University on the Willamette beautiful for situation", the following was written about the coliseum:

Events
In 1903 the student body raised money to start a track and field and football team to play in the gymnasium. An annual statewide track and field event was hosted at Columbia Coliseum from 1905–1915 and 1917–1922. 

In 1907 the Columbia University basketball team joined the Portland Interscholastic League. The first few seasons all the league's teams had to play in the Columbia Coliseum since most venues could not accommodate the relatively new sport of basketball. No wood floor was installed for basketball games, meaning the teams would have to play on dirt.

The Commercial Club, a group of Portland businessmen, donated $10,000 towards upgrading Columbia Coliseum in 1910. That year, the Portland Colts of the Class-B Northwestern League held their spring training camp at the gymnasium. The coliseum was closed temporarily in 1916 due to significant damage to the structure after snow had built-up on the ceiling, causing part of it to cave in. The roof was repaired and the gymnasium re-opened the following year. The last sport to play in the gymnasium was basketball in 1927. It has since been demolished.

References

1903 establishments in Oregon
1927 disestablishments in Oregon
American football venues in Oregon
Baseball venues in Oregon
Basketball venues in Oregon
Defunct college baseball venues in the United States
Defunct college basketball venues in the United States
Defunct college football venues
Demolished sports venues in Oregon
Indoor arenas in Oregon
Portland Pilots
Sports venues completed in 1903
Sports venues in Portland, Oregon
Demolished buildings and structures in Portland, Oregon
Baseball in Portland, Oregon